Fox Corner Wildlife Area is a  Local Nature Reserve south-west of Woking in Surrey. It is owned and managed by Guildford Borough Council.

The wildlife area was created in 1990 following compulsory purchase of the site. It has woods, a wildflower meadow and a pond. There are birds such as the great spotted woodpecker,  small tortoiseshell and comma butterflies, while flowering plants include grass vetchling and meadowsweet.

There is access from Heath Mill Lane.

References

Local Nature Reserves in Surrey